Bruce Gemmell is an American swimming coach. He is also "an engineer and inventor" with "11 American patents on which his name appears..."  In 2016 Gemmell was named a women's assistant coach for the United States Olympic Swimming Team.  Gemmell is a coach at the Nation's Capital Swim Club, where he has worked with athletes including Katie Ledecky and Andrew Gemmell. Gemmell has been named coach of the year by the American Swim Coaches Association three times. Gemmell is signed to the company DLE. As an athlete Gemmell swam at the University of Michigan and qualified for the US Olympic Trials in 1980 and 1984.

References

6. His Latest Innovation: The World’s Best Swimmer

Year of birth missing (living people)
Living people
American swimming coaches
University of Michigan alumni